Louise Osmond is a British documentary filmmaker.

Osmond graduated from the University of Oxford with a degree in modern history. Before she became a filmmaker, Osmond worked as a journalist and editor in Brussels, Paris, Rome and Africa. During this time, she was working in the news journalism graduate trainee for the UK network ITN.

Some of Osmond's film titles include: Deep Water (2006), Blitz: London`s Firestorm (2005), The Beckoning Silence (2007), McQueen and I (2011), Richard III: The King in the Car Park (2013), and Dark Horse (2015). Osmond most well known recent films include Dark Horse (2015) and Versus: The Life and Films of Ken Loach (2016).

Osmond has won the International Emmy Award for Documentary and had been nominated for the News & Documentary Emmy Award for Outstanding Historical Programming – Long Form and the British Academy Television Award for Best Specialist Factual for her work.

References

British filmmakers
Living people
Year of birth missing (living people)